Alfred Edward Flaxman (1 October 1879 – 1 July 1916) was a British track and field athlete who competed in the 1908 Summer Olympics.

He was born in Wombwell, West Riding of Yorkshire and was killed in action in Gommecourt, Pas-de-Calais, France.

In 1908, he participated in the discus throw competition, in the Greek discus throw event, in the freestyle javelin throw competition, and in the standing high jump event but in all these competitions his final ranking is unknown.

Flaxman was killed in action during the First World War, serving as a second lieutenant with the South Staffordshire Regiment on the first day of the Battle of the Somme, aged 26. His remains were not recovered and he is commemorated on the Thiepval Memorial.

References

See also
 List of Olympians killed in World War I

1879 births
1916 deaths
Athletes (track and field) at the 1908 Summer Olympics
Olympic athletes of Great Britain
British male discus throwers
English male high jumpers
English male discus throwers
English male javelin throwers
South Staffordshire Regiment officers
British military personnel killed in the Battle of the Somme
British Army personnel of World War I
Sportspeople from Yorkshire
People from Wombwell
Military personnel from Yorkshire